John William Dowling (May 13, 1807 – July 4, 1878) was an American Baptist minister, the author of The History of Romanism: from the Earliest Corruptions of Christianity to the Present Time.

Personal life 
John Downling was born in Pevensey, Sussex, England on May 13, 1807. In an irregular way he acquired a classical education, and became a tutor in a classical institution in London in 1826. Three years later he established a boarding-school a few miles from Oxford, where he taught until 1832. In that year he emigrated to New York City with his wife and two children and united with the Baptist church in Catskill, New York, where he was ordained. At this time the cholera was raging as an epidemic. Having left his family in New York City to pay a flying visit to Catskill, he returned to find his wife and one of his children dead from this dreadful disease — already in their coffins, prepared for burial. Overwhelmed with grief, he returned with his remaining child to Catskill, where he became the pastor of the Baptist Church of that place. While laboring here he met and married Maria S. Perkins, daughter of a prominent gentleman of that town, and who bore him a son.

Career 

He held pastorates in New York, Philadelphia, Providence and Newport, R. I. Upon leaving Catskill he accepted a call to the Tabernacle Baptist Church, of New York. Here he remained for several years, during which time his son was born. From here he removed to Providence, R. I., to become the pastor of the First Baptist Church of that town. During his labors in Providence the degree of Master of Arts was conferred upon him by the Trustees of Brown University. From here he removed to New York city, where he labored not only as a pastor, but as a powerful opponent of the Roman Catholic Church. Having enjoyed a liberal college education in his own country, he became a formidable opponent, and entered the list in public discussion with the renowned Archbishop Hughes, at the same time penning the History of Romanism, which went through multiple editions.

On leaving New York he removed to Philadelphia, succeeding the celebrated Dr. Stoughton as pastor of the Sansom Street Baptist Church. Here he was as popular as elsewhere, ministering to one of the largest congregations in the city, and maintaining his high position as a leader in the Baptist denomination. He once more returned to New York, where he again officiated in his holy calling, though with less demonstration. As of 1873 he was sixty-five years of age and in the enjoyment of good health. His son by his second wife grew up to become a doctor.

In 1878, Dowling was placed in the Middletown State Homeopathic Hospital, an insane asylum in Middletown, New York, where he died a few days later.

Works 
His published works include:
 Vindication of the Baptists (New York)
 Exposition of the Prophecies (1840)
 Defence of the Protestant Scriptures (1843)
 History of Romanism (1845), of which 30,000 copies were sold in less than ten years
 Power of Illustration
 Nights and Mornings
 Judson Offering

He edited a Conference hymn-book (1868), Noel's work on Baptism, the works of Lorenzo Dow, Conyer's Middleton, on the Conformity of Popery and Paganism, Memoir of the Missionary Jacob Thomas; and a translation from the French of Cote's work on Romanism.

References

External links 

 Biography of his son John William Dowling: John Dowling is briefly discussed at the beginning.
 Online book: "The History of Romanism: From the earliest corruptions of Christianity to the present time"
 

1807 births
1878 deaths
Critics of the Catholic Church
19th-century Baptist ministers from the United States
American religious writers
American historians of religion
Brown University alumni
People from Pevensey